Eutelia catephioides is a moth of the family Noctuidae. It is found in South Africa, Ethiopia and Saudi Arabia.

References

Moths described in 1852
Euteliinae